Dames SV Zulte Waregem is a Belgian women's football club from Zulte representing SV Zulte Waregem in the Belgian First Division, where it has played since 2004 except for the 2008 and 2009 seasons. It was founded in 1971 as Dames Zultse VV, and became Zulte Waregem's women team in 2010. In its first season as such the team attained its best result so far, a 5th spot.

Players

First-Team Squad

Honours
 Belgian Women's Second Division
Winners (2): 2003, 2009,

Season to season

References

External links
 Official site

Women
Zulte
Zulte
1971 establishments in Belgium
BeNe League teams
Zulte
Waregem
Sport in East Flanders